Heba El Torky (born January 15, 1991, in Alexandria) is an Egyptian professional squash player.

Career
El Torky represented Egypt at the international level. She reached a career-high world ranking of World No. 19 in December 2016.

Heba has a sister named Nouran, who is also a professional squash player.

References

External links

 
 
 

1991 births
Living people
Egyptian female squash players
Sportspeople from Alexandria